The Wekiwa hydrobe or Wekiwa springs aphaostracon, scientific name Aphaostracon monas, is a species of small freshwater snail, and aquatic gastropod mollusk in the family Cochliopidae.

Distribution
This species is endemic to the United States.  Its natural habitat is rivers, and it is named after the Wekiwa springs and Wekiwa River in Florida. The continued existence of this species is threatened by habitat loss.

References

 Hershler R. & Thompson F.G. (1992) A review of the aquatic gastropod subfamily Cochliopinae (Prosobranchia: Hydrobiidae). Malacological Review suppl. 5: 1-140.

Molluscs of the United States
Aphaostracon
Gastropods described in 1899
Taxonomy articles created by Polbot